Group D of the 2014–15 EuroChallenge consisted of BC Avtodor Saratov, BC Astana, Tofas S.K., and CSM Oradea. Play began on 4 November and ended on 16 December 2014.

Teams

Standings

Results

Round 1

Round 2

Round 3

Round 4

Round 5

Round 6

References

Group D
2014–15 in Russian basketball
2014–15 in Turkish basketball
2014–15 in Kazakhstani basketball
2014–15 in Romanian basketball